Armenag Kevorg Bedevian, Effendi, from Armenian descent, author of Illustrated Polyglottic Dictionary of Plant Names, in Latin, Arabic, Armenian, English, French, German, Italian and Turkish Languages, 1936 (with 1711 illustrations), was Director of Gizeh Research Farm, Egypt

According to W. Lawrence Balls, M.A., Sc.D., F.R.S., in the book's preface, "Mr. Bedevian joined me as agricultural assistant at the old Cotton Field Laboratory in 1913 and when I returned to Egypt in 1927 I found him fairly established in the Ministry of Agriculture as Manager of the Giza Experimental Farm, and also Superintendent of the Cotton Seed Control operations, I found that he was not only in possession of masses of data about the farm, about the ginneries, merchants, and the like, but that he could produce summaries, abstracts, and graphs of that information at short notice in reply to any question I might ask about such things. Thus it was evident that he had a flair for order and system".

References 

Bibliography
 William Lawrence Balls, Armenag K. Bedevian. 1929. The operation of the Seed control law upon the pedigree of cotton seed in seasons 1926-27 and 1927-28; 1926-30. Nº 85; Nº 104 de Bulletin, Egypt Wizārat al-Zirāʻah
 --------, --------. 1929. The operation of the seed control law upon the pedigree of cotton seed in ... 1926-27 and 1927-28. Vol. 85 de Bulletin, Egypt Wizārat al-Zirāʻah
 Emine Alçıtepe ve Galip Alçıtepe, "Bitki İsimlerinin Türkçeleştirilmesine Dair Unutulan Bir Kitap: Illustrated Polyglottic Dictionary of Plant Names", Kebikeç, Issue 34, Year: 2014: 209–216. 

20th-century botanists
Egyptian people of Armenian descent
Armenian lexicographers
Year of birth missing